Orlando "Junior" Oberto (born 30 December 1980) is an Italian professional baseball pitcher.

Oberto pitches for T&A San Marino in the Italian Baseball League. He played for the Italian national baseball team in the 2017 World Baseball Classic.

References

External links

1980 births
2016 European Baseball Championship players
2017 World Baseball Classic players
Baseball pitchers
Fortitudo Baseball Bologna players
Grosseto Baseball Club players
Italian baseball players
Living people
T & A San Marino players
Expatriate baseball players in San Marino